Parsa is a village in Mahagama CD block in Godda subdivision of Godda district in the Indian state of Jharkhand.

Geography

Location               

Overview
Rajmahal coalfield is shown in the map. The entire area is overwhelmingly rural with only small pockets of urbanisation.

Note: The full screen map is interesting. All places marked on the map are linked and you can easily move on to another page of your choice. Enlarge the map to see what else is there – one gets railway links, many more road links and so on.

Demographics
According to the 2011 Census of India, Parsa had a total population of 6,101, of which 3,186 (52%) were males and 2,915 (48%) were females. Population in the age range 0–6 years was 1,343. The total number of literate persons in Parsa was 2,293 (48.19% of the population over 6 years).

Education
Millat College at Parsa was established in 1972. It is a constituent college of Sido Kanhu Murmu University. Subjects taught are: Hindi, English, Sanskrit, Urdu, Persian, Santali, economics, history, political science, sociology, philosophy, mathematics, psychology, geography, Home Science. It offers honours and general courses in arts. Millat College also has facilities for teaching in classes XI and XI (Intermediate).

Millat High School at Parsa is a Hindi-medium coeducational institution established in 1946. It has facilities for teaching in classes IX and X.

References

Villages in Godda district